Şehzade Kasım (Ottoman Turkish: شهزاده قاسم; 1614 – 17 February 1638) was an Ottoman prince and the son of Sultan Ahmed I and his wife Kösem Sultan. He was the brother of Murad IV and Ibrahim, and half-brother of Osman II.

Life 
Şehzade Kasım was born in 1614 in Topkapı Palace to Ahmed I and Kösem Sultan. Following his father’s early death in 1617, he, along with his mother and brothers, were banished to the Old Palace (Eski Sarayı).

After Murad’s accession in 1623, Kasım was confined in the Kafes, which was the part of the Imperial Harem where possible successors to the throne were kept under a form of house-arrest and constant surveillance by the palace eunuchs.

Efforts to save Ibrahim from execution 

According to the Turkish historian Necdet Sakaoğlu, during Murad IV’s chaotic reign, Kasım hid and protected his younger brother, Ibrahim, in secret parts of the palace by portraying him as innocent and incompetent.

Death 

During the celebrations of the Ottoman victory at Erivan in 1635, his brothers Bayezid, Selim and Süleyman were executed, leaving Kasım as the heir apparent to the Ottoman throne. 

On 17 February 1638, Kasım was terrified of arousing any suspicion that he had designs on the throne. Thus he was all humility when he presented himself before Murad to pay his respects and wish him success on his expedition to reconquer Baghdad. Murad accepted Kasım’s wishes, and then on that same day, Murad ordered his execution. 

He was buried in Murad III's türbe, in the Hagia Sofia mosque. 

The execution of Kasim was the last case of fraticide in the Ottoman dynasty, after which the Law of Fraticide fell into disuse and was definitively replaced by agnatic seniority as a law of succession.

In popular culture

In the television series Muhteşem Yüzyıl: Kösem, Kasım is played by Turkish actor Doğaç Yıldız.

References

1614 births
1638 deaths
Ottoman princes
People from Fatih
17th-century executions by the Ottoman Empire